Little Wood Dam, also known as the Little Wood River Dam, is a dam on the Little Wood River in central Blaine County, Idaho, United States, about  miles northwest of Carey.

Description
The earthen dam was originally constructed from 1936 to 1939 by the United States Bureau of Reclamation as a flood control and irrigation storage project, then modified in 1960. The 1960 modification included the installation of a one-unit hydroelectric power plant that generates three megawatts. The dam is owned by the Bureau and is operated by the local Little Wood River Irrigation District. Recreation includes fishing (for rainbow, cutthroat, and brook trout), hunting, boating, camping and hiking.

See also
List of dams and reservoirs in Idaho

References

External links

Dams in Idaho
Reservoirs in Idaho
United States Bureau of Reclamation dams
Buildings and structures in Blaine County, Idaho
Earth-filled dams
Dams completed in 1939
Lakes of Blaine County, Idaho